The Horse of Pride is a 1980 rural drama film directed by Claude Chabrol. Its title in French is Le cheval d'orgueil. It is based on Le cheval d'orgueil, an autobiography by Pêr-Jakez Helias. The film takes place in the Bigouden area south of Quimper.

Plot
Set in Brittany from 1908–1918, two peasants marry, have a son, and live in traditional Breton ways which is three generations under one roof, a division of labor between the sexes, elders' stories at night, politics and religion during their little free time. These are difficult times for them – la Chienne du Monde drives some to commit suicide; Ankou (death) is always a possibility. Pierre is born into this provincial family, his lyric childhood interrupted by the outbreak of war and his father's conscription. He learns his catechism and, as a child of a Reds, also reveres school. His grandfather and father often put him on their shoulders, giving him a ride on the horse of pride.

Principal cast

Critical reception
Vincent Canby of The New York Times:

Jackson Adler of Time Out London:

References

External links 

1980 films
Films directed by Claude Chabrol
Films based on French novels
Films set in the 1900s
Films set in the 1910s
French drama films
1980s French-language films
1980 drama films